Jack Cox may refer to:

People
Jack Cox (footballer) (1877–1955), English footballer
Jack E. Cox (1896–1960), English cinematographer
Jack Cox (Texas politician) (1921–1990), Texan politician and gubernatorial candidate

Other uses
Jack Cox (Scrubs), a fictional character in the TV comedy

See also
John Cox (disambiguation)
Jackie Cox (footballer) (1911–1990)